El Grupo Nuevo de Omar Rodriguez Lopez is a band consisting of Omar Rodriguez Lopez (guitar), Cedric Bixler-Zavala (vocals), Juan Alderete de la Peña (bass guitar), Jonathan Hischke (synth bass) and Zach Hill (drums).

History
Originally this side-project of Omar Rodriguez Lopez's was simply a collaboration with Hella drummer Zach Hill, but eventually Rodriguez Lopez formed an entire band, adding The Mars Volta bandmates and frequent collaborators — Cedric Bixler-Zavala and Juan Alderete de la Peña — as well as Hill's Hella colleague Jonathan Hischke to the lineup. Since 2006, three records have been recorded by the group, the first of which, titled Cryptomnesia, was released worldwide on May 5, 2009. In October 2010 Omar and Zach were reportedly going back into the studio to record new El Grupo Nuevo tracks.

Discography

 Cryptomnesia (2009)

References

Musical groups established in 2006
Puerto Rican musical groups